George Lee (9 March 1810 – 29 October 1894) was an English first-class cricketer.

Born at Marylebone in October 1894, Lee made his debut in first-class cricket for the Slow Bowlers in the Slow Bowlers v Fast Bowlers fixture of 1842 at Lord's. He played two further first-class fixtures over the following 18 years, for the Surrey Club against the Marylebone Cricket Club in 1852 at Lord's, and for the Gentlemen of Marylebone Cricket Club against the Gentlemen of Kent in 1860 at Canterbury. He took just one wicket across his three first-class matches, that of Jennings Davison in the Gentlemen of Marylebone Cricket Club v Gentlemen of Kent fixture. He had a more substantial impact as a first-class cricket umpire, standing in 44 matches between 1857–1876. He died at St John's Wood in October 1894.

References

External links
George Lee at ESPNcricinfo
George Lee at CricketArchive

1810 births
1894 deaths
People from Marylebone
English cricketers
Fast v Slow cricketers
Surrey Club cricketers
Gentlemen of Marylebone Cricket Club cricketers
English cricket umpires